The Schweizer Monat. Die Autorenzeitschrift für Politik, Wirtschaft und Kultur ("Swiss Month. Author magazine for Politics, Economy and Culture"), née Schweizer Monatshefte, is a Swiss monthly magazine based in Zürich. Founded in 1921 and relaunched in 2011, it maintains a liberal point of view and is edited by Ronnie Grob.

Former and current authors include:

 Nobel laureates such as Friedrich August von Hayek, James M. Buchanan, Gary Becker, Vernon Smith, Mario Vargas Llosa and Muhammad Yunu
 Literary figures such as Hermann Hesse, Hugo Loetscher, Hermann Burger, Adolf Muschg, Peter von Matt, Hans Magnus Enzensberger, Adam Johnson, Christian Kracht, Klaus Modick, Peter Stamm, Jonas Lüscher, Monika Hausammann and Thomas Hürlimann
 Scientists and intellectuals such as Karl Popper, Wilhelm Röpke, Theodor W. Adorno, Ralf Dahrendorf, Steven Pinker, Michael Graziano, Deirdre McCloskey, Niall Ferguson, David Woodard, Sherry Turkle, Boris Groys, Nassim Nicholas Taleb, Herfried Münkler, Ulrich Beck and Peter Sloterdijk.

Each issue contains interviews with:

 Swiss entrepreneurs like Daniel Borel, Thomas Schmidheiny and Rolf Soiron
 Politicians like Pascal Couchepin, Adrienne Clarkson, Gerhard Schröder and Cédric Wermuth
 Economists like Michael Porter, Parag Khanna and Deirdre McCloskey
 Intellectuals like Philipp Sarasin, Norbert Bolz, Rolf Dobelli and Matt Ridley
 Scientists like Didier Sornette and Gerd Folkers.

References

External links
 Official website

1921 establishments in Switzerland
German-language magazines
Magazines established in 1921
Magazines published in Zürich
News magazines published in Europe
Monthly magazines published in Switzerland
Political magazines published in Switzerland